The IZ is an electronic musical toy released in 2005 from Zizzle. Taking the shape of an abstract tripod figure, the iZ allows users to interactively manipulate music by twisting particular parts of the figure's body as well as add sound effects to pre-recorded sound from a connected audio device. The toy also acts as a dancing speaker.

Since its release it has been available in five color schemes, green/orange, dark blue/light blue, red/yellow, purple/green, and chrome/orange.

iZ was developed by Roger Shiffman, who also created the Giga Pets, Furby and Poo-Chi toys. It was explicitly explained during the development phase that a "new Furby" was the aim. iZ is designed to seem like it has a life of its own and does things out of its user's control when there is interaction with it.

In 2006, McDonald’s had a promotion for the toy with Happy Meals.

Modes of operation
Since the iZ is such an abstract kind of toy the easiest way to understand it is by learning what the user can do with it.

iZ has a few methods for input. First, as mentioned, he has an audio jack to connect other audio devices. He has trumpet-like ears that are twistable and a touch-sensitive tentacle, called a flicker, on his head. On top of this there are also five buttons placed on any places on his colorful tummy. All the input methods except the audio jack are colored in a secondary color to raise his affordance. iZ's three legs are also adjustable, but these do not generate any input.

For output the iZ has a built-in speaker, a nose that lights up in different colors and eyes were driven by small motors making them able to move up and down.

When another audio device is connected to iZ he acts as a speaker but also overlays some sound effects on top of the sound from the audio device. When overlaying his own sound effects he also moves his eyes and lights up his nose. By pressing the left side of his tummy the sound effects will be turned off and iZ will only act as a regular speaker.

When no other audio device is connected iZ has three modes of operation; Play, DJ and WZIZ FM.

In Play mode, which is the start-up mode, iZ lets the user compose his own music by manipulating his inputs. Each ear corresponds to one audio track, the tummy controls the drum track and tempo, and the flicker can be hit for iZ to generate sound effects. iZ randomly adds his own flavor to the track by overlaying silly comments or radio noise.

When in DJ mode iZ evolves the track himself by changing one feature of the track at a time. If the user doesn't like the ongoing music iZ outputs, the tummy can be pressed to force iZ to instantly make a change. No interaction is allowed in this mode, so when the user tries any input which will change the track a simple sound is played to indicate that he registered the input but will never react to it.

As stated in iZ's manual "Although he is not a radio, he thinks he is". In WZIZ FM mode, iZ creates a fully new track every time he makes a change and inserts a noise to simulate the tuning of radio stations between the tracks. If you adjust the ears, which are supposed to be the antenna, you make iZ create a new random track instantly.

Animated adaptation
Zizzle and DIC Entertainment (now WildBrain) created a direct-to-video series, iZ and the Zizzles in 2007. The trailer could be viewed on the Zizzle website. 2 episodes were made, being the pilot and a second episode, "Will the Zizzles Sizzle or Fizzle?".

References

External links
 Zizzle's iZ website
Available archived version of Product's Website

Toy brands
2000s toys
Products introduced in 2005